Beaudein Waaka (born 27 January 1994) is a New Zealand rugby union player who played for the New England Free Jacks in Major League Rugby (MLR). He currently plays for the Kobelco Steelers in Japan Rugby League One.

Professional career

In 2012, Waaka played for Poverty Bay in the Heartland Championship and then he represented  the Taranaki Bulls for 5 seasons in the Mitre 10 Cup competition. 

In 2019, he signed with Manly RUFC. Like his sister, Stacey Waaka, he has also represented New Zealand sevens in rugby sevens.

References

External links
 
 Taranaki Bulls profiles

1994 births
Living people
Expatriate rugby union players in the United States
New England Free Jacks players
New Zealand expatriate rugby union players
New Zealand expatriate sportspeople in the United States
Rugby union centres
Rugby union players from Whakatāne
Taranaki rugby union players
Rugby union fly-halves
Rugby union wings
Rugby union fullbacks
Waikato rugby union players
Kobelco Kobe Steelers players